Radio Guangdong Voice of the City is a branch channel of Radio Guangdong, broadcasting news and information about Guangdong Province, China.

External links
 Radio Guangdong Voice of the City

Chinese-language radio stations
Mandarin-language radio stations
Radio stations in China
Mass media in Guangzhou